Olías del Rey is a municipality located in the province of Toledo, Castile-La Mancha, Spain. , the municipality has a population of 6656 inhabitants.

References

Municipalities in the Province of Toledo